Lago di Ganzirri is a lake in the Province of Messina, Sicily, Italy. At an elevation of 1 m, its surface area is .338 km².

Features
Together with the lake of Faro it has been declared a particularly important asset of ethno-anthropological interest, as it is the historical site of traditional production activities related to mussel and telliniculture.

Gallery

See also
 10 Hours of Messina
 Messina Grand Prix

References

External links
 Ganzirri Lake at Discover Messina Sicily 

Lakes of Sicily